The former Aeromexico headquarters building, also known as Edificio Centro Olímpico ("Olympic Center Building"), was located in the financial district of Mexico City on Paseo de la Reforma overlooking the Diana the Huntress fountain in the Colonia Cuauhtémoc neighborhood. It was built in 1967, designed by Fernando Pineda, Francisco J. Serrano, and Luis MacGregor Krieger.

In May 2017 it was announced that the building would be demolished and a new, taller tower would be built on its and neighboring lots. In October 2017, Aeromexico moved its corporate staff to the Torre MAPFRE at Paseo de la Reforma 243, and other locations. The intention is that the business staff will return to a portion of the new tower once it was built.

Gallery

References

Aeroméxico
Airline headquarters
Buildings and structures completed in 1968
Buildings and structures demolished in 2018
Buildings and structures in Mexico City
Cuauhtémoc, Mexico City
Paseo de la Reforma